Andor Thoma (November 30, 1928, Magyaróvár – May 31, 2003, Paris) was a Hungarian anthropologist. His studies focused on the evolution of Paleolithic hominids. Some of his major works were the examination of the dentition of the Subalyuk Neanderthal child, of the Vértesszőlős finds and of Palestinian fossils.

References

External links 
 In memorian Andor Thoma (1928-2003).. Researchgate.net

Hungarian anthropologists
1928 births
2003 deaths